The HUDA City Centre is a terminal station on the Yellow Line of the Delhi Metro. It is an elevated station and is located in Gurgaon in the National Capital Region of India. The station was inaugurated on 21 June 2010 as part of the Qutab Minar—HUDA City Centre corridor.

History

Station layout

Facilities
List of available ATM at HUDA City Centre metro station are HDFC Bank, Yes Bank, State Bank of India, IndusInd Bank

Entry/Exit

Nearby Colleges and University

Gallery

See also
Haryana
Gurgaon
List of Delhi Metro stations
Transport in Delhi
Delhi Metro Rail Corporation
Delhi Suburban Railway
Delhi Monorail
Delhi Transport Corporation
South East Delhi
National Capital Region (India)
List of rapid transit systems
List of metro systems

References

External links

 Delhi Metro Rail Corporation Ltd. (Official site) 
 Delhi Metro Annual Reports
 
 UrbanRail.Net – Descriptions of all metro systems in the world, each with a schematic map showing all stations.

Delhi Metro stations
Railway stations opened in 2010
Transport in Gurgaon
Railway stations in Gurgaon district
2010 establishments in Delhi